Suzhou Culture and Arts Centre, formerly known as Suzhou Science and Culture Arts Centre (SSCAC), located to the east of Jinji Lake at the China–Singapore Suzhou Industrial Park, Suzhou, Jiangsu, is a cultural centre in China. It occupies an area of 138,000 m2, and its total gross floor area is 150,000 square metres. It is the permanent awards base of China Film Golden Rooster Awards.

References

External links
Suzhou Culture and Arts Centre (English version)

Culture in Suzhou
Cultural centers in China
2007 establishments in China
Suzhou Industrial Park